Martha May Eliot (April 7, 1891 – February 14, 1978), was a foremost pediatrician and specialist in public health, an assistant director for WHO, and an architect of New Deal and postwar programs for maternal and child health. Her first important research, community studies of rickets in New Haven, Connecticut, and Puerto Rico, explored issues at the heart of social medicine. Together with Edwards A. Park, her research established that public health measures (dietary supplementation with vitamin D) could prevent and reverse the early onset of rickets.

Biography 
Martha May Eliot was born in Dorchester, Massachusetts in 1891, to Christopher Rhodes Eliot, a Unitarian minister, and Mary Jackson May. Her father was a scion of the Eliot family, an influential American family that is regarded as one of the Boston Brahmins, originating in Boston, whose ancestors became wealthy and held sway over the American education system in the late 19th and early 20th centuries. Her grandfather, William G. Eliot, was the first chancellor of Washington University in St. Louis. The poet, playwright, critic, and Nobel laureate T.S. Eliot was her first cousin.

During undergraduate study at Bryn Mawr College she met Ethel Collins Dunham, who was to become her life partner. After completing their undergraduate education, the two enrolled together at Johns Hopkins University School of Medicine in 1914.

In 1918, Eliot graduated from medical school at Johns Hopkins University. As early as her second year of medical school, Dr. Eliot hoped to become "some kind of social doctor." She taught at Yale University's department of pediatrics from 1921 to 1935. For most of these years, Dr. Eliot also directed the National Children's Bureau Division of Child and Maternal Health (1924–1934). She later accepted a full-time position at the bureau, becoming bureau chief in 1951. In 1956, she left the bureau to become department chairman of child and maternal health at Harvard School of Public Health.

During her tenure at the Children's Bureau, Eliot helped establish government programs that implemented her ideas about social medicine, and she was responsible for drafting most of the Social Security Act's language dealing with maternal and child health. During World War II, she administered the Emergency Maternity and Infant Care program, which provided maternity care for greater than 1 million servicemen's wives. After the war, she held influential positions in both the World Health Organization and United Nations Children's Fund (UNICEF). From 1949 to 1951, Eliot worked as an assistant director for WHO in Geneva. In 1959, Martha accepted a post as chair of the Massachusetts Commission on Children and Youth, a position she held for a decade.

She served as the chief architect of health provisions for children in the 1935 US Social Security Act, that mandated that every state establish child health services. In 1946, she served as the vice chair of the US delegation to the International Health Conference and on behalf of the US, signed the constitution that established the World Health Organization (she was the only woman to sign WHO's constitution).

Personal life 

Martha Jane Eliot shared her personal life in a long emotional and domestic partnership with Ethel Collins Dunham, also a pioneering female pediatrician, who was made the first female member of the American Pediatric Society and was awarded its highest award, the Howland Medal, in 1957.

Lilian Faderman, the landmark scholar, writes: "[At] Bryn Mawr..she met a twenty-six year old freshman, Ethel Dunham. From 1910 to Ethel's death in 1969, the two women were inseparable. As a couple, Martha Eliot and Ethel Dunham..succeeded in times that were as unsympathetic to professional women as they were to lesbians. Their domestic satisfaction crept constantly into Martha's letters back home: "E. keeps me out doors which is great. This P.M. we are going canoeing. Tonight we are having supper here - oyster omelet, a concoction of Ethel's - and apple sauce and toast and nutbread." "
Their partnership nourished and sustained them through their entire adult lives.
In the 1970s, during Martha's travels for WHO, they wrote day after day: "Dearest, it was hard to say goodbye and I shall miss you terribly.. Ever and ever so much love, my darling"; "How I count the time until you do arrive. I miss you my darling".

Bert Hansen writes: "While Dunham and Eliot are each worthy of individual attention, their shared personal life has such an intimate connection with their careers that a combined narrative better illustrates their close relationship of 59 years. They achieved major professional positions at Yale, at Harvard, and in government, even while they were making careful career choices to maintain the continuity of their domestic partnership. Each was also accorded public honors for leadership in pediatrics, child welfare, and public health."

Awards and honors
Dr. Eliot's service to public health earned her many honors. In 1951, President Truman named her chief of the Children's Bureau. In 1947, she became the first woman elected president of the American Public Health Association. She also was the first woman to receive APHA's Sedgwick Memorial Medal.

 1947 The first female president of the American Public Health Association.
 1947 Mary Woodard Lasker Award for Public Service
 1949 to 1950 The President of the National Council of Social Work
 1958 Sedgwick Memorial Medal
 1967 John Howland Award

The American Public Health Association established the Martha May Eliot Award in 1964 to honor extraordinary health service to mothers and children; to bring such achievement to the eyes of related professional people and the public; to stimulate young people in the field to emulate efforts resulting in such recognition; and to add within the profession and in the eyes of the public to the stature of professional workers in the field of maternal and child health.

References

External links
 
 Martha May Eliot Papers. Schlesinger Library, Radcliffe Institute, Harvard University.

1891 births
1978 deaths
Bryn Mawr College alumni
Johns Hopkins School of Medicine alumni
Yale University faculty
Harvard School of Public Health faculty
American pediatricians
Women pediatricians
Eliot family (America)
Lesbians
LGBT people from Massachusetts
LGBT physicians
20th-century American LGBT people
Burials at Mount Auburn Cemetery
People from Dorchester, Massachusetts